Manipuri may refer to:
 something of, from, or related to:
 the modern-day Indian state of Manipur
 the historical Manipur (princely state)
 Meitei language, the major language of the state
 Manipuri script, a writing system used for the language

 Manipuri people (disambiguation)
 Meitei people, the major ethnic group of the state
 Meitei mythology
 Meitei religion
 Manipuri dance, an Indian classical dance form
 Manipuri pony, a breed of horse

See also
 
 Manapouri, a town in Southland, New Zealand

Language and nationality disambiguation pages